A pagoda is a tiered tower with multiple eaves.

Pagoda may also refer to:

Structures
Chinese pagoda
Japanese pagoda
Korean pagoda
Pagoda (Efteling), an observation tower in the Efteling amusement park in the Netherlands
Pagoda (Reading, Pennsylvania), a novelty building in the U.S.
Chinese Pagoda (Birmingham), a landmark in Birmingham, England
Pagoda mast, the distinctive superstructure of the Imperial Japanese Navy ships of World War II
Pagoda Platform Shelter a distinctive form of waiting shelter on some British railways
La Pagoda, the former headquarters of Laboratorios Jorba in Madrid

Other uses
The Pagoda, a 1923 German silent film
Pagoda (band), an American rock band
Pagoda (album), by Pagoda, 2007
Pagoda (coin), an Indian coin
Pagoda (data structure)
Pagoda shells, marine snails in the subfamily Columbariinae
Pagoda top or Pagoda roof Mercedes-Benz W113, named so for its distinctive roofline
Japanese pagoda tree
Pagoda, a character in the film The Royal Tenenbaums

See also
Pagode, a Brazilian style of music that originated in Rio de Janeiro

pl:Pagoda